Dalry may refer to:

 St John's Town of Dalry, or just Dalry, a village in Dumfries and Galloway, Scotland
 Dalry, Edinburgh, an area of the city of Edinburgh, Scotland
 Dalry, North Ayrshire, a town in Scotland

See also
 Dalrigh
 Battle of Dalrigh